Drofiny is a rural locality (a settlement) in Prikaspiysky Selsoviet, Narimanovsky District, Astrakhan Oblast, Russia. The population was 132 as of 2010. There are 2 streets.

Geography 
Drofiny is located 146 km southwest of Narimanov (the district's administrative centre) by road. Saygachny and Kovylny are the nearest rural localities.

References 

Rural localities in Narimanovsky District